Muhammad Shahdaat Bin Sayeed was a lecturer of Clinical Pharmacy and Pharmacology, at the University of Dhaka, Bangladesh. He is also the International Brain Bee coordinator for Bangladesh.

Career
Sayeed discovered a new cognitive enhancer that led him to win Association of Commonwealth Universities Early Career Award in 2013. His discovery had been extensively discussed around the world, and he had been interviewed by US lifestyle magazine, Prevention. He participated in the 64th Lindau Nobel Laureate Meeting in 2014 in Germany. He was a Bayer Lindau fellow and he presented his work in the Lindau Meeting. Muhammad Shahdaat Bin Sayeed received many awards from USA, UK, Australia, Germany, France, Italy, Belgium, Japan,  Singapore, Taiwan, Iran, Malaysia and other countries for his extraordinary research. Currently he is conducting research on Advanced Drug Delivery, Cognitive Enhancer, Cancer, Pharmacogenetics, Neurotoxicology etc.  He has published many peer reviewed journal papers and book chapters.

References

Living people
Date of birth missing (living people)
Place of birth missing (living people)
Academic staff of the University of Dhaka
Year of birth missing (living people)